Juan Dorronsoro Landá (2 November 1937 – 9 August 1960), known popularly as Xanín, was a Spanish-Basque footballer who played as a forward for Real Betis.

Career
Xanín began playing football with Basque side SD Eibar. He would also play for CE Sabadell FC, before making 14 La Liga appearances with Real Betis.

Personal
Xanín died from leukemia at age 22.

References

1937 births
1960 deaths
Spanish footballers
Association football forwards
La Liga players
SD Eibar footballers
CE Sabadell FC footballers
Real Betis players
Deaths from leukemia
Deaths from cancer in Spain